Kiiminki was a municipality of Finland. Along with Haukipudas, Oulunsalo and Yli-Ii municipalities it was merged with the city of Oulu on 1 January 2013. Kiiminki municipality was part of the Oulu province in the Northern Ostrobothnia region.

The municipality was unilingually Finnish.

Buildings and structures 
There is a 326-metre tall guyed mast for FM- and TV broadcasting.

References

External links

Municipality of Kiiminki – Official website

Municipalities of North Ostrobothnia
Populated places established in 1867
Former municipalities of Finland
Kiiminki